The Hot Kid is a 2005 novel by Elmore Leonard.

Plot summary

This fictional story is set during The Great Depression and follows the career of Carl (Carlos) Webster, a crack shot, well respected, and mannerful lawman who killed his first criminal at the ripe age of fifteen. The reader follows Carlos' career as he begins a long dance of death with Jack Belmont, an ambitious criminal who wants to become public enemy number one. The story follows other characters like Louly Brown, a woman who loves Carlos, but wants to be known as Pretty Boy Floyd's gal. There's also writer Tony Antonelli, of True Detective magazine, who wants to write like a pro, and wishes Elodie, a gal he likes, wasn't a whore. The novel is full of grade-A action and violence perpetrated through criminals, lawmen, Tommy guns, bank robberies, hot cars, all falling against the backdrop of Prohibition.

Carl Webster is presented as the son of Virgil Webster, introduced in Leonard's 1998 novel Cuba Libre. Both men reappear in Leonard's 2007 novel Up In Honey's Room.

Real life contemporary bank robbers who make an appearance in the novel include Bonnie and Clyde, Pretty Boy Floyd, Machine Gun Kelly, John Dillinger and Baby Face Nelson

Reception

Janet Maslin of The New York Times described the book as 'far from being an exercise in nostalgia, this book reinvigorates what Mr. Leonard might have experienced at his most impressionable: the mythmaking process that turned commonplace crooks into figures of folklore'

References

External links
 The Hot Kid at Elmore Leonard's Official Website

2005 American novels
Novels by Elmore Leonard
Great Depression novels
HarperCollins books